Macrothyatira transitans is a moth in the family Drepanidae first described by Constant Vincent Houlbert in 1921. It is found in Yunnan, China.

References

Moths described in 1921
Thyatirinae
Moths of Asia